Toru Miyoshi ( Miyoshi Tōru; 31 October 1927 – 6 March 2023) was a Japanese judge. He served as Chief Justice of Japan from 1995 to 1997.

Miyoshi died in Tokyo on 6 March 2023, at the age of 95.

References

1927 births
2023 deaths
Chief justices of Japan
Members of Nippon Kaigi
Grand Cordons of the Order of the Rising Sun
University of Tokyo alumni
Imperial Japanese Naval Academy alumni
People from Tokyo